Oregon Route 204 (OR 204) is an Oregon state highway running from OR 11 in Weston to OR 82 in Elgin. OR 204 is known as the Weston-Elgin Highway No. 330 (see Oregon highways and routes).

Route description
OR 204 begins at an intersection with OR 11 at Weston and heads east to Tollgate.  At Tollgate, it curves southward until shortly before Elgin, where it turns east and terminates at an intersection with OR 82.

The highway serves the Spout Springs Ski Area, near Tollgate.

History
The Weston-Elgin Highway was constructed between 1915 and 1938 to replace lower-quality private roads that had previously connected the two cities.

Major intersections

References

204
Transportation in Umatilla County, Oregon
Transportation in Union County, Oregon